The NCU Challenge Cup, also called the NCU Senior Challenge Cup and the NCU Senior Cup, is the most important provincial cricket knock-out cup of the NCU jurisdiction in Ireland. The competition began in 1887, with eleven clubs participating in the first competition, North Down eventually beating North of Ireland in the final at Ormeau.

The Cup is open to teams playing in the Premier League and Section 1 of the NCU Senior League. It is sponsored by Arthur J Gallagher and marketed as the Arthur J Gallagher Challenge Cup.

Matches consist of one innings per side, with fifty overs bowled per innings. Where matches are interrupted or delayed because of weather, the number of overs may be reduced to a minimum of 20. Duckworth Lewis is employed where a match is interrupted after it has started.

The most successful club in the competition is North Down with 32 victories (1 shared)

CIYMS are the current holders after beating Civil Service of Northern Ireland in the 2022 Final

List of finals
Source for finals up to 2002: J. Clarence Hiles (2003), A History of Senior Cricket in Ulster. Comber: Hilltop Publications Ltd.

1880s

1890s

1900s

1910s

1920s

1930s

1940s

1950s

1960s

1970s

1980s

1990s

2000s

2010s

2020s

Summary of winners

See also
NCU Senior League
Ulster Cup
NCU Junior Cup
Leinster Senior Cup
North West Senior Cup

References

CricketEurope archives

External links
 Northern Cricket Union

Irish domestic cricket competitions
1887 establishments in Ireland